Tjuneroy (also Tjenry) was an Ancient Egyptian official under king Ramses II in the 19th Dynasty. Tjuneroy is mainly known from objects found in his tomb at Saqqara. He came from an influential family. His father Paser (I) was royal scribe and was working for the Amun temple. His brother Paser (II) was again royal scribe but was also overseeing royal building works.  The tomb chapel of Tjuneroy was once decorated with reliefs that are now in the Egyptian Museum in Cairo. One wall in the tomb chapel was decorated with a king list that is known as the Saqqara Tablet. Tjuneroy is also known from fragments of a door frame found at Pi-Ramesses indicating that he lived there. His titles include chief lecture priest and overseer of all royal works.

References 

13th-century BC Egyptian people
Officials of the Nineteenth Dynasty of Egypt
Ramesses II